Jérôme Leroy (born 4 November 1974) is a French former professional footballer who played as an attacking midfielder.

Playing career
Born in Béthune, Pas-de-Calais, Leroy started playing for Paris Saint-Germain. With PSG he participated in the final of the 1997 Cup Winners' Cup which was lost to FC Barcelona. During the 1995–96 season he joined Stade Lavallois on loan.

Following a stint at Olympique de Marseille, he returned to PSG, where he reached the 2003 French Cup final.

He moved to En Avant Guingamp during the 2003–04 winter transfer window.

Luis Fernández, Leroy's former mentor at Paris Saint-Germain, brought him to Teddy Stadium, home to Beitar Jerusalem F.C., in December 2005 from Ligue 1 club RC Lens, beating off competition from l'OM. On 25 June 2006, Beitar took off from Ben Gurion International Airport on an El Al flight to the Netherlands for preseason training. Leroy chose not to join the team opting to check options of staying in France for the 2006–07 season. A deal with FC Sochaux-Montbéliard was ultimately arranged.

With Sochaux he won the 2006–07 Coupe de France. The game finished 2–2 and went to penalties, and Leroy scored his penalty in the shootout as his side emerged victorious.

For 2007–08, Leroy joined Stade Rennais, where he was dubbed "Leroy (le roi, "the king") de la passe" (king of assists). He stayed in Rennes until 2011.

In 2011, Leroy moved to newly promoted Ligue 1 club Évian after signing a one-year contract on 5 July 2011. He spent one season with Évian.

On 29 June 2013, after one year without a club, Leroy joined Ligue 2 side FC Istres. A year later, he signed a one-year contract with Le Havre AC.

In January 2015, he signed for LB Châteauroux.

Post-playing career
Following his retirement, Leroy became sports director of his last club, Châteauroux.

Personal life
Leroy's son Léo Leroy is also a professional footballer.

Career statistics

Honours
Paris Saint-Germain
 Trophée des Champions: 1998

Lens
 UEFA Intertoto Cup: 2005

Sochaux
 Coupe de France: 2006–07

References

External links
 Jérôme Leroy's profile, stats & pics
 
 

1974 births
Living people
People from Béthune
Sportspeople from Pas-de-Calais
French footballers
Footballers from Hauts-de-France
Association football midfielders
Olympique de Marseille players
Paris Saint-Germain F.C. players
Stade Lavallois players
RC Lens players
Beitar Jerusalem F.C. players
En Avant Guingamp players
FC Sochaux-Montbéliard players
Stade Rennais F.C. players
Thonon Evian Grand Genève F.C. players
Le Havre AC players
Ligue 1 players
Ligue 2 players
Championnat National 2 players
Israeli Premier League players
French expatriate footballers
French expatriate sportspeople in Israel
Expatriate footballers in Israel